The Mono Basin National Forest Scenic Area is a protected area in Eastern California that surrounds Mono Lake and the northern half of the Mono Craters volcanic field. It is administered by the Inyo National Forest as a unit of the National Forest Scenic Area program, under the U.S. Forest Service.

History

The site was first described by tourists in Mark Twain's Roughing It.

Mono Basin became the first National Forest Scenic Area in the United States in 1984.

Visitor Center
The Mono Basin National Forest Scenic Area Visitor Center is located 1/2 mile north of the town of Lee Vining, California, just east of Tioga Pass (the eastern entrance to Yosemite National Park), on U.S. Route 395.

A variety of activities and exhibits introduce the natural and human history of the Mono Basin. A 20-minute film, an interactive exhibit hall, two art galleries, and a book store are available inside.

Features
Mono Craters
Mono Lake Tufa State Reserve
Panum Crater

See also
Mono Lake Committee

References

External links

Mono Lake Tufa State Reserve website
CA.Parks: Mono Lake tufa tower images
 

Protected areas of Mono County, California
Inyo National Forest
National scenic areas
Protected areas of California
Protected areas of the Sierra Nevada (United States)
Protected areas established in 1984
Geography of Mono County, California
Museums in Mono County, California
Natural history museums in California
United States Forest Service protected areas
1984 establishments in California